The Académie des Inscriptions et Belles-Lettres is a French learned society devoted to history, founded in February 1663 as one of the five academies of the Institut de France. The academy's scope was the study of ancient inscriptions (epigraphy) and historical literature (see Belles-lettres).

History

The Académie originated in 1663 as a council of four humanists, "scholars who were the most versed in the knowledge of history and antiquity":  Jean Chapelain, François Charpentier, Jacques Cassagne, Amable de Bourzeys, and Charles Perrault. In another source, Perrault is not mentioned, and other original members are named as François Charpentier and a M. Douvrier. The organizer was King Louis XIV's finance minister Jean-Baptiste Colbert. Its first name was the Académie royale des Inscriptions et Médailles, and its mission was to compose or obtain Latin inscriptions to be written on public monuments and medals issued to celebrate the events of Louis' reign. However, under Colbert's management, the Académie performed many additional roles, such as determining the art that would decorate the Palace of Versailles.

In 1683 Minister Louvois increased the membership to eight. In 1701 its membership was expanded to 40 and reorganized under the leadership of Chancellor Pontchartrain. It met twice a week at the Louvre, its members began to receive significant pensions, and was made an official state institution on the king's decree.  In January 1716 it was permanently renamed to the Académie royale des Inscriptions et Belles-Lettres with the broader goal of elevating the prestige of the French monarchy using physical symbols uncovered or recovered through the methods of classical erudition.

The Académie produced a catalogue of medals created in honor of Louis XIV, Médailles sur les événements du règne de Louis le Grand, avec des explications historiques, first published in 1702. A second edition was published in 1723, eight years after Louis' death. Each page of the catalogue featured engraved images of the obverse and reverse of a single medal, followed by a lengthy description of the event upon which it was based. The second edition added some medals for events prior to 1700 which were not included in the first volume, and in some cases the images of medals in the earlier edition were altered, resulting in an improved version. The catalogues may therefore be seen as an artistic effort to enhance the king's image, rather than as an accurate historical record.

Role
In the words of the Académie's charter, it is:

primarily concerned with the study of the monuments, the documents, the languages, and the cultures of the civilizations of antiquity, the Middle Ages, and the classical period, as well as those of non-European civilizations.

Today the academy is composed of fifty-five French members, forty associate foreign members, fifty French corresponding members, and fifty foreign corresponding members. The seats are distributed evenly among "orientalists" (scholars of Asia and the Islamic world, from ancient times), "antiquists" (scholars of Greece, Rome, and Gaul, including archaeologists, numismatists, philologists and historians), "medievalists", and a fourth miscellaneous group of linguists, law historians, historians of religion, historians of thought, and prehistorians.

The Volney Prize is awarded by the Institut de France, based on the proposal of the Académie. It publishes Mémoires.

Prizes, grants and medals awarded by the Académie 

Prizes

 Prix Ambatielos
 Prix d'histoire des religions de la fondation "Les Amis de Pierre-Antoine Bernheim"
 Prix des antiquités de la France
 Prix Emile Benveniste
 Prix Bordin
 Prix du budget
 Prix Honoré Chavée
 Prix Croiset
 Prix Duchalais
 Prix Paule Dumesnil
 Prix Roman et Tania Ghirshman
 Prix Gobert
 Prix Hirayama
 Prix de la Grange
 Prix Serge Lancel
 Prix Raymond et Simone Lantier
 Prix Marie-Françoise et Jean Leclant
 Prix Gaston Maspero
 Prix Jean-Charles Perrot
 Prix George Perrot
 Prix Jeanine et Roland Plottel
 Prix Saintour
 Prix Émile Sénart
 Prix Léon Vandermeesch
 Prix de l'Institut de France 2018
 Prix de la Fondation Colette Caillat
 Grand Prix d'archéologie de la Fondation Simone et Cino del Duca
 Prix Jean_Edouard Goby
 Prix Hugot
 Prix Stanislas Julien

Grants

 Subvention Louis de Clercq
 Bourse Courtois
 Subvention de la Fondation Dourlans
 Subvention Garnier-Lestamy
 Subvention Max Serres de la Fondation Eve Delacroix
 Bourse Jacques Vandier

Medals

 Médailles des Antiquités de la France
 Médaille Jean-Jacques Berger
 Médaille Clermont-Ganneau
 Médaille du Baron de Courcel
 Médaille Delalande-Guérineau
 Médaille Drouin
 Médaille Alfred Dutens
 Médaille Fould
 Médaille Gobert
 Médaille Stanislas Julien
 Médaille le Fèvre-Deumier
 Médaille Gustave Mendel
 Médaille Gabriel-Auguste Prost

Prominent members

Eugène Albertini
Antoine Anselme
Jean Sylvain Bailly
Anatole Jean-Baptiste Antoine de Barthélemy
Charles Batteux
Pierre Louis Jean Casimir de Blacas
Michel Bréal
Antoine Leonard de Chézy
Charles Simon Clermont-Ganneau
Jean-Baptiste Colbert
Henri Cordier
André Dacier
Léopold Delisle
Jean Denis, comte Lanjuinais
Gabriel Devéria
Louis Duchesne
Émile Egger
Jean-Baptiste Benoît Eyriès
André Félibien
Jean François Boissonade de Fontarabie
Nicolas Fréret
Bernard le Bovier de Fontenelle
Étienne Fourmont
Antoine Galland
Ernst Hoepffner
Pierre Amédée Jaubert
Stanislas Julien
Alexandre Maurice Blanc de Lanautte, Comte d'Hauterive
Pierre Henri Larcher
Jean Lebeuf
Edmond Le Blant
Charles-François Lebrun, duc de Plaisance
Jean Leclant
Émile Littré
Leonardo López Luján
Jean Mabillon
Louis Ferdinand Alfred Maury
Joachim Menant
Franz Miklosich
Agénor Azéma de Montgravier
Jean Marie Pardessus
Alexis Paulin Paris
Claude-Emmanuel de Pastoret
Armand-Pierre Caussin de Perceval
Charles Perrault
Francois Pouqueville
Louis Racine
Charles-Frédéric Reinhard
Jacques Nicolas Augustin Thierry
Jacques de Tourreil
Anne Robert Jacques Turgot, Baron de Laune
Joseph Vendryes
William Henry Waddington
Charles Athanase Walckenaer
Henri-Alexandre Wallon

Publications
 Publications of the Académie des Inscriptions et Belles-Lettres (1710-1843)

See also
French art salons and academies

References

External links

Notes on the Académie des Inscriptions et Belles-Lettres from the Scholarly Societies project

Inscriptions et Belles-Lettres
Latin epigraphy
Greek epigraphy
1663 establishments in France